Fishtrap, also known as Beavers Fish Trap or Sims Trap, is an unincorporated community in Talladega County, Alabama, United States.

References

Unincorporated communities in Talladega County, Alabama
Unincorporated communities in Alabama